The ERA - European Rental Association is a trade association representing the equipment rental sector in Europe.

History and Mission
ERA was set up in 2006 to promote and represent the equipment rental industry, which was largely overlooked and seen as an integral part of the construction industry itself. ERA represents over 5,000 rental companies in Europe, either directly or through its 15 rental association members (14 national associations and one international). 

Its work focuses on 7 main areas:

 Promotion of the rental concept
 Technical issues and equipment
 Statistics on the European rental market
 Sustainability in the rental industry
 Harmonisation of national regulations in Europe
 Awareness of the challenges of the future of the rental industry
 Support for rental associations

Structure
ERA, like most trade associations, uses working committees which meet regularly throughout the year and develop deliverables that may be of use to member companies and associations.

There are currently 5 committees and 2 working groups:

• Technical Committee• National Associations Committee• Promotion Committee• Statistics Committee• Sustainability Committee

• Future Group  

• Cybersecurity working group

Members 
Direct members of ERA can either be rental associations or rental companies with operations in Europe. Equipment manufacturers and other suppliers to the rental industry can become associate members.

International Exhibitions and events
ERA is the co-organiser of the International Rental Exhibition, IRE, which takes place every 3 years and is the largest European trade show for the equipment rental business. The event raises the profile of the rental industry in Europe, standing alongside Intermat and Bauma as the two other large European construction exhibitions.

See also
Equipment rental
Renting
Operated equipment rental
Equipment service management and rental
Rental relocation
Rental accessories and attachments

References

Construction equipment rental companies
Rental
Trade associations based in Belgium